Anatoly Nikolaevich Bondarenko (born 25 August 1949) is a retired Russian ice speedway rider who won two Individual Ice Speedway World Championship's in 1979 and 1980 and two Team Ice Racing World Championships in 1979 and 1980.

World final appearances

Ice World Championship
1978 –  Assen, 2nd – 24pts
1979 –  Inzell, champion – 30pts
1980 –  Kalinin, champion – 29pts
1983  Eindhoven, 2nd - 28pts

Family
His brother Nikolai Bondarenko  and nephew Ilya Bondarenko are also retired speedway riders.

References

1949 births
Living people
Soviet speedway riders
Ice Speedway World Champions